Pali Dome is a subglacial volcano in the Pacific Ranges of the Coast Mountains in southwestern British Columbia, Canada. For the past 2 million years, the Mount Cayley volcanic field has had interactions between ice and lava which have created some unique landforms and an in-ice drainage system."Pali" comes from the Hawaiian word that means cliff or steep hill, while dome refers to the lava dome, which is when doughy lava flows from a volcanic vent which is usually rounded and flat on top.

One of the last known eruptions of the Pali Dome was over 10,000 years ago.

See also
List of volcanoes in Canada
Mount Cayley volcanic field
Volcanism of Canada
Volcanism of Western Canada

References

External links
Catalogue of Canadian volcanoes: Pali Dome

Mountains of British Columbia
Volcanoes of British Columbia
Pacific Ranges
Sea-to-Sky Corridor
Pleistocene volcanoes
Holocene volcanoes
Mount Cayley volcanic field
Polygenetic volcanoes
Subglacial volcanoes of Canada